In mathematics, more specifically in functional analysis, a subset  of a topological vector space  is said to be a total subset of  if the linear span of  is a dense subset of  
This condition arises frequently in many theorems of functional analysis.

Examples 

Unbounded self-adjoint operators on Hilbert spaces are defined on total subsets.

See also

References 

  

Functional analysis
Topological vector spaces